Mansfield School District  is a public school district based in Mansfield, Arkansas. MSD provides early childhood, elementary and secondary education to more than 950 students and employs more than 150 educators and staff for its three schools and district offices.

The school district encompasses  of land in Scott, Sebastian, and Logan counties.

Within Sebastian County the school district boundary includes that county's part of Mansfield and all of Huntington. The portion of the district in Scott County includes the remainder of Mansfield.

History 
On January 8, 1889, the Mansfield School District was formed. A two-story school building was constructed to meet growing educational needs in 1905 at the cost of $10,000; it served the district until a new high school was built in 1968. Many area schools were consolidated into the district, with the last being the Huntington district in the mid-1960s.

The Phyllis Wheatley School, located in Huntington, was a school established for the African-American children in the region of south Sebastian County. Students in the first through eighth grades attended the school. Those students above the eighth grade had to attend high school in Fort Smith (Sebastian County), even though a high school was less than a mile away across Cherokee Creek and two miles away in Mansfield. The Phyllis Wheatley School was consolidated with Mansfield Public School in 1962; many other area schools were also consolidated into the Mansfield district around that time.

A new elementary school was built in 1964; it is still used today. In 2004, students began attending a new high school complex, which included a gymnasium and football stadium, built near the old area of the original Chocoville site.

Schools 
 Mansfield High School, serving grades 9 through 12.
 Mansfield Middle School, serving grades 5 through 8.
 Mansfield Elementary School, serving prekindergarten through grade 4.

References

External links
 

Education in Logan County, Arkansas
Education in Scott County, Arkansas
Education in Sebastian County, Arkansas
School districts established in 1889
School districts in Arkansas
1889 establishments in Arkansas